

Incumbents  
 President - Árpád Göncz
 Prime Minister - József Antall (until 12 December), Péter Boross (starting 12 December)

Events

March 
 30 March - Act No. 22 of 1992 - Labour Code (consolidation) is adopted.

May 
 25–29 May - International conference on interaction of computational methods and measurements in hydraulics and hydrology

August 
 16 August - The Hungarian Grand Prix is held in Budapest

December 
 24 December - Duna TV channel is launched.

Births 
 3 November - Willi Orbán, German-born Hungarian international footballer

Deaths

January 

 2 January – Tibor Gallai, 79, Hungarian mathematician.
 6 January – Éva Balázs, 49, Hungarian cross-country skier and Olympian.
 7 January – Andrew Marton, 87, Hungarian-American film director, cancer.
 8 January – Nicolas Schöffer, 79, Hungarian-French cybernetic artist.
 31 January – István Sárközi, 44, Hungarian Olympic footballer (1968), traffic collision.

February 

 9 February – Andor Földes, 78, Hungarian pianist, fall.
 25 February – Guy Deghy, 79, Hungarian-British actor.
 29 February – Ferenc Karinthy, 70, Hungarian novelist, playwright, and journalist.

July 

 30 July – Miklós Borz, 70–71, Hungarian soldier and politician.

August 

 4 August – József Faddi (71-72), Hungarian agronomist and politician.

See also
Hungary at the 1992 Summer Olympics
List of Hungarian films since 1990

References

 
1990s in Hungary
Hungary
Hungary